James Douglas Smith (born 21 April 1977) is a former English cricketer. Smith was a right-handed batsman who played primarily as a wicket-keeper. He was born in Leicester, Leicestershire.

Smith represented the Leicestershire Cricket Board in two List A matches. These came against Hertfordshire in the 1999 NatWest Trophy and the Durham Cricket Board in the 2000 NatWest Trophy. In his 2 List A matches, he scored 13 runs at a batting average of 13.00, with a high score of 11. His one not out innings resulted in him having a higher batting average than his highest score. Behind the stumps he took a single catch.

References

External links
James Smith at Cricinfo
James Smith at CricketArchive

1977 births
Living people
Cricketers from Leicester
English cricketers
Leicestershire Cricket Board cricketers
Wicket-keepers